Horninglow railway station is a disused railway station in Horninglow, a district of Burton upon Trent, Staffordshire.

History 
The station was opened by the North Staffordshire Railway in 1848 next to the level crossing of the A38/Derby Road where it entered Burton.

The line itself dated back to 1848, and, from 1878 was shared by the Great Northern Railway (Great Britain) with its GNR Derbyshire and Staffordshire Extension.

The station buildings were more substantial than at Rolleston, being a single storey of half-timbered brick construction. A small waiting room was added on the second platform at the request of the Board of Trade in 1888. It closed to passengers on 1 January 1949. Although the station was no longer used as a stop for the 'Tutbury Jinnie' (as the local Burton-Tutbury passenger service was affectionately known), it continued to be used for occasional holiday excursion trains and the line remained in use for freight until 2 April 1966 when the last train - a short freight headed by a diesel shunter - passed through and was greeted by a half dozen trainspotters. The signal box adjacent the station, which had been active until then, closed the same day.

Post-closure history 

The platforms were trimmed in the sixties and the building converted into a cafe. The outside toilet and station building/cafe remained until the 1990s, when they were demolished to make way for housing. The stationmaster's house, across the road from the station, eventually became a private dwelling and is still occupied today.

References

Further reading

Disused railway stations in Staffordshire
Railway stations in Great Britain opened in 1848
Railway stations in Great Britain closed in 1949
Former North Staffordshire Railway stations